The South Australian Ice Hockey Association, currently trading as Ice Hockey South Australia is the governing body of ice hockey in South Australia, Australia. The South Australia Ice Hockey Association is a Member Association (MA) of Ice Hockey Australia.

Background
The South Australian Ice Hockey Association (SAIHA) was formed as the South Australian state branch for Ice Hockey Australia. It is responsible for organising the five state leagues across the three different age groups. It is also responsible for selecting the state teams to compete in the national tournaments.

IHSA operates its leagues out of the Ice Arena in Thebarton, Adelaide, South Australia.  Teams are fielded in the leagues by five winter league clubs – the Falcons Ice Hockey Club, Blackhawks Ice Hockey Club, Redwings Ice Hockey Club,  Tigers Ice Hockey Club, Jokers Ice Hockey Club and also available to the semi-retired players is the Adelaide Vintage Reds Ice Hockey Club. The Association's current President is Glen Winkler.

Leagues
Premier League – the top senior checking league in South Australia
Senior A – the top senior non-checking league in South Australia
Senior B – the second tier senior non-checking league in South Australia
Senior C – the third tier senior non-checking league in South Australia
Grade A Junior – the top junior league in South Australia
Grade B Junior – the second tier junior league
Grade C Junior – the third tier junior league
Bantam Division – junior league open to players 16 and under
Peewee Division – junior league open to players 13 and under

2020 Teams
Teams playing in the 2020 season:

Premier League
Adelaide Blackhawks
Adelaide Falcons
Adelaide Redwings
Adelaide Tigers
Adelaide Jokers

Senior A
Adelaide Blackhawks
Adelaide Falcons
Adelaide Redwings
Adelaide Tigers
Adelaide Jokers

Senior B
Adelaide Blackhawks
Adelaide Falcons
Adelaide Redwings
Adelaide Tigers
Adelaide Jokers

Senior C (Winter)
Adelaide Blackhawks
Adelaide Falcons
Adelaide Redwings
Adelaide Tigers
Adelaide Jokers

See also

Ice Hockey Australia
Australian Women's Ice Hockey League
Australian Junior Ice Hockey League

References

External links
Ice Hockey South Australia

Ice hockey governing bodies in Australia
Ice